Tenyka Francique (born 22 February 1991) is a Canadian-born Guyanese retired footballer who played as a forward and a goalkeeper. She has been a member of the Guyana women's national team.

Early life
Francique was raised in Brampton, Ontario.

High school and college career
Francique attended the International High School. After graduating there, she joined the Gannon University in Erie, Pennsylvania, United States.

International career
Francique capped for Guyana at senior level during the 2010 CONCACAF Women's World Cup Qualifying qualification.

See also
List of Guyana women's international footballers

References

1991 births
Living people
Citizens of Guyana through descent
Guyanese women's footballers
Women's association football forwards
Women's association football goalkeepers
Gannon Golden Knights women's soccer players
Guyana women's international footballers
Guyanese expatriate footballers
Guyanese expatriate sportspeople in the United States
Expatriate women's soccer players in the United States
Soccer players from Brampton
Canadian expatriate women's soccer players
Canadian expatriate sportspeople in the United States
Canadian sportspeople of Guyanese descent